Devasena was a Jain monk of 11th century CE belonging to Mula Sangha who wrote Bhavasangraha and Darsanasara.

References

Citations

Sources
 
 

11th-century Jain monks